The 1989 World Table Tennis Championships men's singles was the 40th edition of the men's singles championship. 

Jan-Ove Waldner defeated Jörgen Persson in the final, winning three sets to two to secure the title.

Results

See also
List of World Table Tennis Championships medalists

References

-